Talal Al-Rashidi (born 24 July 1993) is a Kuwaiti professional target shooter. He competed in the trap event at the 2012 Summer Olympics.

Al-Rashidi qualified for the 2012 Summer Olympics shooting events when he won a silver medal at the 2012 Asian Shooting Championships.

References

External links
 

1993 births
Living people
Kuwaiti male sport shooters
Olympic shooters of Kuwait
Shooters at the 2012 Summer Olympics
Sportspeople from Kuwait City
Trap and double trap shooters
Shooters at the 2020 Summer Olympics
Islamic Solidarity Games competitors for Kuwait